The Antarctic continental shelf is a submerged piece of the Antarctic continent that underlies a portion of the Southern Ocean — the ocean which surrounds Antarctica. The shelf is generally narrow and unusually deep, its edge lying at depths averaging 500 meters (the global mean is around 100 meters), with troughs extending as far as 2000 meters deep. It is home to a thriving ecosystem of penguins and cold-water fish and crustaceans. This profound submersion is a result of ice sheet loading, thermal subsidence, and long-term erosion due to climatic variations over the past 34 million years.

Several countries have issued proclamations claiming ownership over parts of the shelf, including Chile (since 1947), Australia (since 1953), France, and Argentina.

Effect on Antarctic Ice Sheet
It has been shown that there is an amplification in the impact made on the Antarctic Ice Sheet (AIS) given changes in the Antarctic continental shelf. For example, increasing AIS volume directly increases Antarctic continental shelf erosion. This is known as glacial erosion. Increased erosion of the continental shelf makes the AIS more sensitive to ocean forcing — the sum of forces that amplify the ocean's ability to affect climate and surface conditions. These dynamics are very well understood for the Miocene to Pleistocene eras. However, understanding continental margin changes sufficiently to further understand AIS dynamics and how the ice sheet reacted subsequently to atmospheric and oceanic condition changes in the modern day is important in producing accurate models for current and future climate change.

References

Geography of the Southern Ocean
Continental shelves